Michael Shmith (born 7 July 1949) is an Australian journalist and writer.

He was born on 7 July 1949, the son of Athol Shmith and his wife Patricia "Bambi" née Tuckwell (they later divorced). He worked at The Age in Melbourne from 1981 until 1995, when he became communications director for the Australian Ballet. Shmith was then a senior writer for The Age and its arts editor from 1985 to 1993. From 2010 to 2017 he was the paper's opera critic. He resigned from the position in August 2017 alleging it was over a disagreement with The Ages arts editor who had no space left to publish an unsolicited review.

He edited the 1999 Ebury Publishing edition of The New Pocket Kobbé's Opera Book with his stepfather George Lascelles, 7th Earl of Harewood.

References

External links
 

1949 births
Living people
Classical music critics
Journalists from Melbourne
Opera critics
Place of birth missing (living people)